Turricula profundorum is a species of sea snail, a marine gastropod mollusk in the family Clavatulidae.

Description
The length of the shell is around 34 mm, with a diameter 12 mm.

The white shell has a fusiform shape. The length of the narrow aperture equals almost half of the length of the shell. The labral sinus is broad, rather deep and situated at the suture.

It is related to and differs from Turricula navarchus in the strongly developed, but relatively sparse peripheral nodes.

Distribution
This species occurs in the Indian Ocean in deep water off the Maldives.

References

 E. A. Smith (1896), Ann. & Mag. Nat. Hist., ser. 6, vol. 18, p. 369

External links
 Indo-Pacific Mollusca; Academy of Natural Sciences of Philadelphia. Delaware Museum of Natural History v. 2 no. 9–10 (1968–1969)

profundorum
Gastropods described in 1896